Mats Grotenbreg (born 21 January 1998) is a Dutch professional footballer who plays for GVVV as a defender. He also assists his father Ronald as a coach at amateur team GVA.

References

1998 births
Living people
Dutch footballers
TOP Oss players
Tweede Divisie players
Eerste Divisie players
Association football defenders
People from Doetinchem
Footballers from Gelderland
PSV Eindhoven players
SBV Vitesse players
VV DUNO players
USV Hercules players
GVVV players